A sky island is a mountain range isolated by valleys in which other ecosystems are located.

Sky island may also refer to:

Arts and entertainment
Sky Islands, an album by Ramsey Lewis
Sky Islands (album), an album by Caldera
Sky Island (novel), a children's fantasy novel by L. Frank Baum

Places
 Sky Island Scenic Byway, Pima County, Arizona, USA; a highway

See also

 Floating island (fiction), a fictional landmass that floats in the sky
 Isle of Skye, Scotland, UK

 Island in the Sky (disambiguation)
 Island (disambiguation)
 Sky (disambiguation)